Players is a BBC Books original novel written by Terrance Dicks and based on the long-running British science fiction television series Doctor Who. It features the Sixth Doctor and Peri meeting Winston Churchill during the Boer War and prior to the abdication of the would-be king Edward VIII.  Flashbacks scenes feature the Second Doctor meeting Winston Churchill in 1915 during the First World War, these sequences serving as a partial prequel to Dick's subsequent novel World Game, which is set during Season 6B.

External links

1999 British novels
1999 science fiction novels
Past Doctor Adventures
Sixth Doctor novels
Second Doctor novels
British science fiction novels
Novels by Terrance Dicks
Doctor Who multi-Doctor stories